The 1956 Oklahoma Sooners football team represented the University of Oklahoma in the 1956 NCAA University Division football season. It was the 62nd season of play for the Sooners and they repeated as consensus national champions. They were led by hall of fame head coach Bud Wilkinson, in his tenth season. On the field, the Sooners were led on offense by quarterback Jim Harris, and played their home games at Oklahoma Memorial Stadium in Norman, Oklahoma.

After another undefeated season, Oklahoma was first in both final polls in early  Their winning streak was up to forty  but they did not play in a bowl game due to the Big Seven's  runner-up Colorado was invited to and won the Orange Bowl.

Schedule

Roster
QB Jimmy Harris, Sr.
HB Tommy McDonald, Sr.
C Jerry Tubbs, Sr.

Game summaries

Texas

Rankings

Awards
C Jerry Tubbs (All-American, Heisman Finalist)
G Bill Krisher (All-American)
HB Tommy McDonald (All-American)
G Ed Gray (All-American)

Postseason

NFL Draft
The following players were drafted into the National Football League following the season.

References

Oklahoma
Oklahoma Sooners football seasons
College football national champions
Big Eight Conference football champion seasons
College football undefeated seasons
Oklahoma Sooners football